Hannan may refer to:

Hannan (surname), a common Irish surname coming from the Gaelic Ó hAnnáin or Ó hAnáin
 Hannan  (Arabic: "gracious"), popular first name in Middle-Eastern cultures
Hannan, Osaka, city in southern Osaka Prefecture, Japan
Hannan University, a university located to the south of Osaka, Japan
Hannan District, in Wuhan, Hubei, China
Hannan Rathorr, in Kashmir

See also 
 Hanan (disambiguation)
 Hennan